Moya Brennan (born Máire Philomena Ní Bhraonáin on 4 August 1952), also known as Máire Brennan, is an Irish folk singer, songwriter, harpist, and philanthropist. She is the sister of the musical artist known as Enya. She began performing professionally in 1970 when her family formed the band Clannad.  Brennan released her first solo album in 1992 called Máire, a successful venture. She has received a Grammy Award from five nominations and has won an Emmy Award. She has recorded music for several soundtracks, including Titanic, To End All Wars and King Arthur.

Musical upbringing 
Máire Philomena Ní Bhraonáin was born on 4 August 1952 in Dublin after her parents eloped from County Donegal to marry in County Louth. Máire grew up as the eldest child of a musical family in the remote parish of Gweedore (Gaoth Dobhair), a Gaeltacht area in County Donegal, where the Irish language and tradition continue to flourish. Her mother Máire (née Ní Dhúgáin or Duggan in English) was a music teacher and her father, Leo Brennan, was a member of a cabaret band with whom she performed as a child.

Moya is the eldest of nine children. She has four sisters, Deirdre, Eithne (better known as Enya), Olive and Brídín, and four brothers, Ciarán, Pól, Leon and Bartley. She sang along with her siblings in the family pub, Leo's Tavern in the village of Meenaleck, a short distance from the family home. She also took part in pantomimes at the local Amharclann Ghaoth Dobhair (Gweedore Theatre). After leaving secondary school, Brennan spent a few years at the Royal Irish Academy of Music in Dublin studying the harp, the piano and singing. She has also taught music at Holy Cross College in Falcarragh, County Donegal.

Years with Clannad 

In 1970, Brennan joined her two brothers Pól and Ciarán, and their mother's twin brothers Noel and Pádraig Ó Dúgáin, and eventually formed Clannad. They were introduced to television by Irish musician and broadcaster Tony MacMahon. After enjoying a decade of being among the world's foremost Irish musical groups, Clannad graduated to chart success in 1982 with the album Magical Ring. Brennan was at the forefront of the group's success and her voice suddenly became synonymous with Celtic music and Irish music. She recorded 17 albums with Clannad and has won a Grammy, a BAFTA and an Ivor Novello award with the quintet. Her sister, Eithne Ní Bhraonáin, spent a couple of years with Clannad in the early 1980s, and went on to pursue a very successful solo career as Enya.

Following Clannad's 2008 reunion tour, it was announced that Brennan would be working on a new unplugged album with the group, for release in 2009, but that never came to fruition.

Solo career 
Brennan released her first solo album in 1992, Máire, on Atlantic Records. Misty Eyed Adventures on BGM followed three years later. In 1998, Brennan signed with Word Records and released Perfect Time, and Whisper to the Wild Water a year later. The album was nominated for the Grammy Award for Best New Age Album in 2001. Brennan is managed by her husband Tim Jarvis and her brother Leon Ó Braonáin. Her music is usually classified as New Age or Celtic. She accepts the Celtic label, but has at times indicated a slight discomfort with being seen as "New Age" as much of her music is strongly Christian, with several of her songs centring on maintaining a relationship with Jesus. Some of her songs show influences from her Roman Catholic upbringing or seem relational due to her own views concerning Mary, the mother of Jesus.

In 2000, her autobiography, The Other Side of the Rainbow. was published and she also performed her song "Perfect Time" live at World Youth Day in Rome in front of crowds of pilgrims and Pope John Paul II. There were 2.1 million people present, making it the largest crowd ever gathered in the Northern Hemisphere. She considered it an honour as she believes in mutual respect among Christians. Moya also recorded on the event's album, One. She recorded a duet with Booley, now known as Duke Special. The song, titled "Peace Has Broken Out", is about the Troubles in Ireland.

In film, she was featured vocalist on King Arthur (2004), co-writing the title theme "Tell Me Now (What You See)" with Hans Zimmer and wrote additional music score for To End All Wars (2001). In 1995, she duetted with Shane MacGowan with "You're the One" for the movie Circle of Friends. Brennan has collaborated with many other musicians, including Chicane, Alan Parsons, Bono, Robert Plant, Van Morrison, Michael McDonald from the Doobie Brothers, Bruce Hornsby, Joe Elliott, The Chieftains, Paul Young, Paul Brady, Michael Crawford, Joe Jackson and Ronan Keating.

In total Brennan has recorded 25 albums, and has sold 20 million records. Since 2002, she has promoted herself as Moya Brennan — a spelling closely resembling the phonetic pronunciation of her name for those not familiar with the Irish variant of the spelling – and, in 2009, she legally changed her name by deed poll. Under this moniker she released an album entitled Two Horizons in 2003 under her new label, Universal. She has also collaborated with dance artist Chicane for performing the vocals on the single "Saltwater", which was also featured in the VisitScotland advertising campaign, as well as having been used by Fáilte Ireland to promote Ireland, and by Belfast city council, both in television adverts.

On 17 March 2004, she performed at the Speaker's Luncheon on Capitol Hill in front of President George W. Bush and Irish dignitaries.

During the World Youth Day 2005 in Cologne, she performed with Pope Benedict XVI in the Vigil in front of a million people and was also part of the official WYD CD Building on World.

2006 saw the release of her Christmas album, simply entitled 'An Irish Christmas', although it was originally planned to bear the title 'Love Came Down'. A year later, Brennan released her album 'Signature', which she described as a collection of snapshots of her life. The album featured only one Irish song but featured choruses and backing vocals in her native language throughout.

While touring with the latter album, during 2007 and 2008, Moya recorded several collaborations and guest vocals on albums by Iona, Joanne Hogg and with Grand Canal on Ireland's Official Olympic Anthem, "Green to Gold. All three recordings were in aid of several charities.

Her 2008–2009 live album Heart Strings was recorded with the Royal Liverpool Philharmonic and Julie Feeney. Moya has toured to promote the album extensively in the Netherlands, Germany, Ireland and England.

In 2009, Brennan recorded the official soundtrack on Maryland Public Television documentary film 'Intrepid Journal' which documents 50 years of American foreign policy, from World War II to the September 11 attacks.

In April 2010, Moya released a new studio album with harpist and live band member Cormac de Barra. My Match Is a Makin' was recorded for her Spring 2010 tour of the Netherlands, and is available only during her tours. The album is expected to become more widely available in 2010.

Moya Brennan announced that she was working on a hymns album, possibly for 2010 release and would release a new acoustic music album with Clannad in 2010 or 2011. The new Clannad album is slated for a 2013 release in September.

Brennan was the featured headliner for the Atlanta Celtic Christmas concert, recorded live by Georgia Public Broadcasting on 18–19 December 2010. This annual festive event at Emory University's Schwartz Center spans music and dance from Irish, Scottish, and Appalachian traditions.

Moya Brennan appeared as well on the album "Excalibur III – The Origins" written by Alan Simon, a musician who comes from Brittany (France). She sang, indeed, on the following tracks : "The Origins Part I and II", "Incantations" and "Sacred Lands".
Moreover, she went in July 2012 to Brocéliande, in Brittany, where she performed as soloist before performing at the concert "Excalibur III – The Origins".

Brennan was scheduled to perform at the National Geographic Society in Washington, DC on 17 March 2012.

In 2013, Moya Brennan released a new studio album called Voices & Harps – Affinity in collaboration with harpist Cormac de Barra as a follow up to the album Voices & Harps, which was released in 2011. It contains brand new tunes composed by Brennan and de Barra, several traditional tunes in Irish and a cover after Christopher Cross' song "Sailing" which also serves as the album's lead single.

2017 saw Brennan release Canvas, her first solo album in almost a decade. Co-written by her two children, Aisling and Paul, the album was released on 24 February 2017 and was supported by a UK, Irish and European tour through 2018.

In 2020, Brennan was part of an Irish collective of female singers and musicians called "Irish Women in Harmony", that recorded a version of the song "Dreams" in aid of the charity Safe Ireland, which deals with domestic abuse which had reportedly risen significantly during the COVID-19 lockdown.

Moya Brennan Band 
Moya Brennan tours with a large band of musicians who have each recorded solo projects in the past or have recorded with their own bands. The band includes harpist and television presenter Cormac de Barra. Between August 2008 and February 2009, two new members joined Moya's band, the first changes since her Two Horizons Tour, including Irish singer Daithí Rua. 
In 2012, Moya's daughter, Aisling Jarvis, became a permanent member of her band. Aisling joins Brennan on all solo tours, as well as Moya's project with Cormac DeBarra, "Voices & Harps".

Band members

 Cormac de Barra
 Sinéad Madden
 Aisling Jarvis
 Éamonn Galldubh
 Fionán de Barra
 Dave Curley
 Paul Byrne
 Yoshi Izumi
 Paul Jarvis
 Hughie Boyle
 Will Keating
 Sam Jackson
 Daithí Rua
 Tiarnán Ó Duinnchinn
 Máire Breatnach
 Rob Jones
 Ewan Cowley
 Feargal Murray
 Deirdre Brennan
 Tim Jarvis
 Éamonn de Barra

Legacy and recognition 
Brennan and Clannad are credited with the creation of contemporary Celtic music and are held in high esteem for their vast contribution to bringing new life to old Irish songs. They have been compared to Seán Ó Riada, in that they brought the Irish language into popular culture through their music. One critic said: "Clannad's music offers a terrific fusion between traditional and modern influences." U2 singer Bono (who duetted with Brennan on the Clannad song "In a Lifetime") said of her voice: "I think Máire has one of the greatest voices the human ear has ever experienced." Brennan also plays harp, which she has featured on many Clannad records, with her album Two Horizons being based on the discovery of the harp. Brennan's vocal range has once been described as a "breathy soprano".

In May 2022, Brennan's contributions were recognised by the awarding of an honorary doctorate by Dublin City University, alongside aircraft leasing leader Domhnal Slattery, at a ceremony attended by Brennan's immediate family, as well as her mother and her sister Enya.

Personal life 
Brennan wrote an autobiography called The Other Side of the Rainbow in 2000, in which she recalls her upbringing as the eldest of nine siblings in rural Donegal. Along with the highs of success in the music business, she also recounts low periods where alcohol, drugs and an abortion made her re-evaluate her life. She emerged from her "dark years" as a committed Christian, with rekindled faith. She remarried in 1991, having previously been married to a Dublin musician, the Late Pat  Farrell, who passed away on January 14th 2023.

Philanthropy
Moya Brennan is also a philanthropist.

Christian Blind Mission
In 2003, Moya Brennan became Goodwill Ambassador to Christian Blind Mission Ireland (CBM). Brennan's first trip was to Congo-Kinshasa, with a group of five others. Due to violence, Moya and her team fled civil unrest and were evacuated to Kenya. She later promised to return to the Congo, which she did in 2005 to airlift three children from isolated jungle villages to Kinshasa.

In that same year, she travelled to Rwanda, where she kept a diary of her experiences. In 2005, she made an Irish-language documentary for TG4 during her visit to Congo, which was broadcast in 2007, and again in 2008 on both TG4 and RTÉ.

Moya also travelled to shanty-towns in Brazil and performed a fund-raising event in the country with Assiria Nascemento in 2007. From there Moya travelled to Belize for the opening of a school for abused children, run by the Liberty Foundation and backed by CBM. At the opening, Brennan brought together the Belizean Prime Minister Said Musa, Minister of Finance, Leader of the Opposition and UK Conservative Party member and businessman with extensive business interest in Belize, Michael Ashcroft, Baron Ashcroft.

The following year, Brennan travelled to Tanzania and has played a major role in bringing the missions of the charity to the forefront. She has also performed concerts worldwide with other Christian Blind Mission Goodwill Ambassadors from Europe.

Helping those with addiction
Brennan performs various concerts in aid of charities and groups that work to rehabilitate those affected by drug addiction and alcohol dependency. She also practices religion with her family in Dún Laoghaire, at a church which also reaches out to young people affected by drug and alcohol misuse.

Nature preservation
With family band Clannad, Brennan has recorded numerous songs about the needed protection of the landscapes in Ireland and the devastation of pollution around the world. The first song about the matter was recorded for their debut album and was called "An Pháirc". Throughout Moya's solo career, she has recorded various songs on the issue including "Big Yellow Taxi".

In July 2005, Brennan took part in a protest alongside poet Cathal Ó Searcaigh and locals of County Donegal to protest against the installation of electric cables across various areas of the county due to the harm it could cause to both people and the landscape.

Other appointments and music
In 1985, Brennan along with her band members in Clannad donated their song "Almost Seems (Too Late To Turn)" to Children in Need, becoming the British charity appeal's first official single.

In 1986, Brennan performed alongside Bono, Bob Geldof and Chris de Burgh for Self Aid. She also performed with Clannad at the concert. Moya and Clannad have long been supporters of Amnesty International and contributed their single "Rí na Cruinne" to the organisation. Brennan has also attended various benefits in both Ireland and England, most notably alongside Van Morrison in 1996.

Brennan has recorded dozens charitable singles and on many more albums with various artists, including "Raphael's Journey" by Joanne Hogg in 2008, "Songs for Luca" and "Songs for Luca 2" by Iona, and the official song for Ireland's 2008 Olympic Team, "Green to Gold". Moya also donated her b-side "Ceolfaidh Mé" to the Field of Hope album, which also features Bono and The Corrs. In October 2008, Brennan was appointed director for Ireland's first Christian satellite radio station, UCB Ireland, which operates from Dublin. Moya also recorded a song under her birth name "Máire Ní Bhraonáin" on the 2009 Ceol Cheann Dubhrann album with Manus Lunny to raise funds for Áislann Rann na Feirste and Scoil Náisiúnta Rann na Feirste.

In 2020, Brennan was part of an Irish collective of female singers and musicians called Irish Women in Harmony, that recorded a version of "Dreams" in aid of the SafeIreland charity that deals with domestic abuse, which had reportedly risen significantly during the COVID-19 lockdown.

Discography

Studio albums
1992 – Máire
1994 – Misty Eyed Adventures
1998 – Perfect Time
1999 – Whisper to the Wild Water
2003 – Two Horizons
2005 – An Irish Christmas
2006 – Signature
2010 – My Match Is A Makin' (with Cormac de Barra)
2010 – T with the Maggies (with T with the Maggies)
2011 – Voices & Harps (with Cormac de Barra)
2013 – Affinity (with Cormac de Barra)
2017 – Canvas
2019 – Timeless (with Cormac de Barra)

Live albums
2005 – Óró - A Live Session
2007 – Signature Special Tour Edition
2008 – Heart Strings

Singles
1992 – "Against the Wind"
1992 – "Jealous Heart"
1993 – "Big Yellow Taxi"
1995 – "You're the One" (with Shane MacGowan)
1998 – "Heal This Land"
1998 – "The Big Rock"
1999 – "Saltwater" (with Chicane)
2000 – "Follow the Word"
2003 – "Show Me"
2003 – "Tara"
2003 – "Saltwater" (with Chicane– re-issue)
2005 – "I'll See You Again/Hidden" (with Hazel O'Connor)
2006 – "No One Talks"
2007 – "Merry-Go-Round"
2007 – "Holiday Trio"
2008 – "Green to Gold" (with Grand Canal)
2013 – "Sailing" (with Cormac de Barra)
2021 – "Strong In Numbers (Moya Brennan single)" (with Liam O'Connor)

Charitable albums
2005 – A Future for the Michel (with Schiller)
2008 – Sanctuary (Various artists)
2009 – Ceol Cheann Dubhrann (Various artists)

Compilations and collaborations
1987 – "The Awakening" – with Paul Brady (from Primitive Dance)
1990 – "Put 'em Under Pressure" (single)
1991 – "Bring It All Back Home" – with An Emotional Fish (from Blue)
1993 – "Come into My Life" – with Robert Plant (from Fate of Nations)
1993 – "Dream Fields" – with Runrig (from Amazing Things)
1994 – "Almond Skin" – with Sonny Condell (from Someone to Dance With)
1994 – "Dream Sequence" – with Sonny Condell (from Someone to Dance With)
1994 – "The Man Who Wrote Danny Boy" – with Joe Jackson (from Night Music)
1994 – "As Tears Go By" – with London Symphony Orchestra (from Symphonic Music of the Rolling Stones)
1995 – "You're The One" – with Shane MacGowan (from Circle of Friends soundtrack)
1995 – "Luman Michael O'Suilleabhain" – with Brian Kennedy (from Between Worlds)
1996 – "Ó Bhean a' Tí" – with Dónal Lunny, Brídín Brennan & Deirdre Brennan (from Common Ground: The Voices Of Modern Irish Music)
1996 – "Everything Changes" (and various tracks) – with Iona (from Journey into the Morn)
1998 – "Amazing Grace" – with Michael Crawford (from On Eagles Wings)
1998 – "Come Josephine in My Flying Machine" (from Back to Titanic soundtrack)
1999 – "Saltwater" – with Chicane
1999 – "Don't Give Up" – with Michael McDonald (from Streams & Whisper to the Wild Water)
1999 – "The Call of the Wild" – with Alan Parsons (from The Time Machine)
1999 – "Lullabies" (on Silent Night) – with The Chieftains & Paola Cecchi (from Silent Night: A Christmas in Rome)
2000 – "Saylon Dola" – with Russell Watson (from The Voice)
2000 – "No Scenes of Stately Majesty" (from The Greatest Story Ever Sung)
2000 – "Fairytale of New York" – with Ronan Keating (from The Way You Make Me Feel)
2000 – "Peace Has Broken Out" – with Booley (from One)
2000 – "Ceolfaidh Mé" (from Fields of Hope: Fight Against Famine)
2000 – "The Light on the Hill" (from St. Patrick: The Irish Legend soundtrack)
2000 – "Over Blue City" – with Skypark (from Over Blue City)
2000 – "Rose of Bethlehem" (from One Silent Night)
2001 – New Irish Hymns album – with Margaret Becker & Joanne Hogg
2001 – "O Jesus Friend Unfailing" (from The Sound of Grace: Focusfest 2001)
2001 – To End All Wars soundtrack
2001 – "Band of Brothers Requiem" – with Michael Kamen (from Band of Brothers soundtrack)
2003 – "Ave Maria" – with Dominic Miller (from Shapes)
2003 – "Codail A Linbh (Sleep O Child)" – with Phil Coulter (from An Irish Holiday)
2004 – Tell Me Now (What You See), All of Them & Woad to Ruin tracks – with Hans Zimmer (from King Arthur)
2004 – "Labyrinth Prelude", "Labyrinth" – with Liam Lawton (from Another World)
2005 – "Hidden" – with Hazel O'Connor (from Hidden Heart)
2005 – "Beautiful Dreamer" – with Brian Kennedy (from On Song 2: Red Sails in the Sunset)
2005 – "Miles And Miles", "Falling" – with Schiller (from Day and Night (Tag Und Nacht))
2005 – "Away", "The Rubicon" – with The Duggans (from Rubicon)
2005 – "I'll See You" – with Delirious? (from The Mission Bell)
2005 – "Kiss The Book", "Like the Baseless Fabric" & "Set Me Free" (from The Book of Watermarks)
2008 – "I Will Never Love Again" – duet with Christie Hennessy (from The Two of Us)
2008 – "You Are Beautiful" – The Worship Lounge (various artists)
2008 – Rafael's Journey – with Joanne Hogg (Moya sings back up on a couple tracks on this album)
2008 – "Green to Gold" – with Grand Canal (from Green To Gold)
2008 – Sanctuary (various artists) – Moya performs on many of the tracks
2008 – Down by the Sea-Ashley Davis-This I Do (background vocals)
2009 – Ceol Cheann Dubhrann-Various Artists-Ceol Cheann Dubhrann
2009 – Love Will Bring You Home-Sharon Kips Welcome Home (duet with Sharon Kips)
2009 – Honey Promises Sinead Madden (Moya sings back up on "Shadows" & "Take Me")
2010 – Welcome Home: The Music Of Ireland-Various Artists-(Moya performs on several tracks and hosts the DVD special)
2010 – San Patricio-Various Artists-Lullaby for the Dead
2010 – Nowhere to Now Here (from the Nowhere to Now Here Soundtrack)
2010 – Welcome To America: The Music of Ireland (Moya sings "Down by the Sally Gardens with Ronan Tynan)
2010 – Re-Joyce The Hazel O'Connor Collective (Moya sings a brief along with a number of other artists)
2011 – "Morning Star" with Producer DJ Roger Shah
2011 – "The Dream" with Secret Garden (from "Winter Poem")
2011 – "An t-Eibhlín Marie" on the charity album "Le Cuidiú Dé" – Moya also sings backing vocals for the title track called "Le Cuidiú Dé".
2012 – Celtic Skies Various Artists (Down by the Sally Gardens)
2012 – "Excalibur III – The Origins" from Alan Simon – Moya sings on "The Origins Part I & II", on "Incantations" and on "Sacred Lands" 
2012 – A Mother's Prayer-Keith & Kristyn Getty's album Hymns for the Christian Life
2012 – Celtic Wings-Pat O'May (Moya sings background on the song "Homeland").
2016 -  "Reasons To Live" with Roger Shah
2021 - “Rivers” with Trance Wax

Bibliography
 1989 – Past Present
        Sheet music book for 'Past Present'
 1991 – A Woman's Voice
        Eddie Rowley in conversation with Máire Brennan
 2000 – Ireland: Landscapes of God's Peace, Máire Brennan
        sometimes called God of Peace
 2001 – The Other Side of the Rainbow, Máire Brennan with Angela Little
        Later subtitled: The Autobiography of the Voice of Clannad
 2008 – Moments in a Lifetime, Noel Duggan
        Detailing Clannad's journey as a band

Notes

References

External links

 
 
 

Living people
20th-century Christians
20th-century Irish women singers
21st-century Christians
Alumni of the Royal Irish Academy of Music
Atlantic Records artists
Clannad members
Emmy Award winners
Grammy Award winners
Irish Christians
Irish folk harpists
Irish folk singers
Irish harpists
Philanthropists from Dublin (city)
Irish pop singers
Irish rock singers
Irish women singer-songwriters
Irish-language singers

Musicians from County Donegal
People from Gweedore
T with the Maggies members
21st-century Irish women singers
Bertelsmann Music Group artists
1952 births